Éric Aubijoux  (December 8, 1964 – January 20, 2007) was a French motorcycle rider. He competed in the Dakar Rally six times, before being killed during the 2007 edition of the event.  He was the second fatality of the 2007 Dakar, following the death of fellow motorcyclist, South African Elmer Symons, eleven days earlier.

Éric Aubijoux died on the 14th and penultimate stage between Tambacounda and Dakar. Initially it was thought that this was due to heart failure, however after investigation the cause of death was determined to be the result of an accident. The confusion was caused by the fact that his bike appeared to be undamaged. It is believed he pulled over feeling unwell and then collapsed due to a seizure. He never regained consciousness and died at the scene. He was declared 18th position overall, and was competing in his 6th Dakar Rally.

References

1964 births
2007 deaths
French motorcycle racers
Motorcycle racers who died while racing
Sport deaths in Senegal
Dakar Rally drivers